Franziska Becskehazy (born 7 February 1966) is a Brazilian cross-country skier. She competed in the women's 10 kilometre classical at the 2002 Winter Olympics.

References

External links
 

1966 births
Living people
Brazilian female cross-country skiers
Olympic cross-country skiers of Brazil
Cross-country skiers at the 2002 Winter Olympics
Sportspeople from Rio de Janeiro (city)